The Lingxiao Rock, or Lingxiaoyan, also known as Lingxiao Cave, is a karst cave located in Helang Town, Yangchun, Yangjiang. Characterized by the karst topography, it is about 60 meters high and 30 meters wide.

The stalactites in the cave are all naturally formed without any artificial carvings; therefore, it is touted as the "First Cave in the South China". In 2003, Lingxiao Cave was assessed as a National Geological Park in China.

References

Landforms of Guangdong
Limestone caves
Tourist attractions in Guangdong